Conceição do Rio Verde is a Brazilian municipality of the state of Minas Gerais. Its population is 13,684 (2020 estimate).

References

Municipalities in Minas Gerais